Plectranthias cruentus, the bloody perchlet, is a species of ray-finned fish in the subfamily Anthiinae, part of the family Serranidae, the groupers and sea basses.

References

cruentus
Taxa named by Anthony C. Gill
Taxa named by Clive D. Roberts
Fish described in 2020